Georgetown High School is a 5A public high school located in Georgetown, Texas (USA). It is part of the Georgetown Independent School District located in central Williamson County.  GHS is a comprehensive high school. The school was a National Blue Ribbon Award winner in 1994–1995. In 2011, the school was rated "Academically Acceptable" by the Texas Education Agency.

Athletics

The 11,000-capacity Birkelbach Field is the main stadium of the Georgetown Eagles.
The Georgetown Eagles compete in the following sports:
Cross Country, Volleyball, Football, Basketball, Wrestling, Marching Band, Powerlifting, Swimming, Soccer, Golf, Tennis, Track, and Baseball.

State titles

 Girls' basketball
 1979 (3A), 2013 (4A)
 Boys' track
 1917 (1A)
Baseball - 
2022(5A)
One Act Play – 
1955 (1A), 1958 (1A), 1965 (2A)
 State Marching Band
 1980 (4A), 1981 (4A), 1982 (4A), 1983 (4A), 1984 (4A), 1985 (4A), 2011 (4A)
 Men's swimming
 2019 (5A)

Notable people

Alumni
 Brian Anderson (broadcaster), American sportscaster
 Mason Crosby, professional football player
 Conan Gray, musician
 Taylor Jungmann, professional baseball player
 Rebekah Grace "Gracie" Kiltz, inspiration for charitable organizations
 Corey Knebel, All-Star MLB player
 Nick Krause, actor
 Andrew McKirahan, professional baseball player

Faculty
 Art Briles, football coach

References

External links

Georgetown ISD

Educational institutions in the United States with year of establishment missing
High schools in Williamson County, Texas
Public high schools in Texas